The 1966 Toro earthquake, or the 1966 Ruwenzori earthquake, occurred on March 20 at 01:42 UTC (04:42 Uganda local time). The earthquake was located near the border between Uganda and the Democratic Republic of the Congo (DRC), to the south of Lake Albert. Some sources put the epicenter in Uganda while some put it in the Democratic Republic of the Congo. The earthquake had a magnitude of  6.8 and a maximum perceived intensity of VIII (Severe) on the Mercalli intensity scale.

Tectonic setting
The earthquake occurred in the Mt Rwenzori region, which lies within the Western Rift Valley of the East Africa Rift System, between Lake Edward and Lake Albert. The Mt. Ruwenzori region is the most seismically active region in Uganda and also one of the most seismically active zones in the East Africa Rift System and is bounded by steep active normal faults. The calculated focal mechanism for the earthquake was normal faulting in type, although the focal mechanisms of three of the aftershocks were dominantly strike-slip in type.

Damage
Extensive damage was reported in both Uganda and the DRC. The earthquake caused 157 deaths: 104 in Uganda, one in Tanzania and 52 in the DRC. Buildings collapsed in both Uganda and the DRC. In Bundibugyo, the Court Hall was damaged. Cracks and fissures were observed on the ground. This earthquake could be felt in Uganda, the Democratic Republic of the Congo, Rwanda, Burundi, Tanzania, and Kenya. Landslides triggered by the earthquake blocked roads, impeding relief efforts.

According to press reports, a strong aftershock on May 18, 1966, caused 90 deaths in the DRC. This aftershock caused damage to buildings in both Uganda and the DRC.

Earthquake

The earthquake was preceded by numerous foreshocks on March 18 and 19, 1966, and was followed by many aftershocks during the next two months, nine of them with a magnitude of 5.0 or greater.

The energy release of the main shock was about 2×1017 Nm. The energy release associated with aftershocks after April 18 was also significant. The sum of energy release of the aftershocks up to 45 days after the main shock was also about 2×1017 Nm, i.e. roughly equal to that of the main shock.

See also 
 List of earthquakes in 1966
 List of earthquakes in DR. Congo
 Tooro Kingdom
 Toro sub-region

References

External links

Toro earthquake, 1966
Earthquakes in Rwanda
Earthquakes in the Democratic Republic of the Congo
1966 in Uganda
1966 in Tanzania
1966 in Rwanda
1966 in Burundi
1966 in Kenya
1966 in the Democratic Republic of the Congo
1966 disasters in Africa